„Us, ours and yours“ is a Bulgarian comedy series. It is largely inspired by the American "Step by Step" series, which was broadcast in Bulgaria in 1994, 2006 (Nova TV), 2009 and 2016.

Episodes

Series overview 
Two lovers middle-aged, five children and mother in law under one roof - this is a newly created family Ivanov. Lili is the first love of Christo and Hristo - her first love. Between the first kiss and their wedding has been more than 20 years during which they have a marriage behind him and five children - two daughters and three sons Lili for Hristo. There is also another challenge in front of them - the heroine Lili is back not only to his first love, but in his native Bulgaria because of her previous husband has lived in Greece and England. Is it possible to love and more importantly - is it possible marriage once bitten? Excessive burden they have five different age and temperament children? What clash of generations born and sufficient Is love to smooth misunderstandings, especially when besides the age difference is in social status, interests and perceptions of life heroes? And what is to come back to their homeland, seeking its place and true love?

Cast and characters 
 Elena Petrova - Lilly
 Kiril Efremov - Hristo
 Radina Borshosh - Despina "Dessi"
 Daria Hadjiiska - Elena-Kristina "Eka"
 Martin Jelankov - Martin
 Martin Tsolov - Ivaylo "Ivo"
 Simeon Angelov - Vili
 Stefka Yanorova - Svetla
 Daniel Angelov - Bojinov
 Velichka Geogrieva - Margarita "Margo" Zografska
 Krasimir Rankov - Obzor "Zorko"
 Stefan Popov - Kristian
 Tsvetelin Pavlov - Krumov
 Anton Poryazov - Rosen "Roskata"

Guest Appearances 
 Dicho Hristov
 Dara
 Nadezhda Petrova

Broadcast 
The premiere of the series is on March 8, 2017 and is broadcast every Wednesday at 9:00 pm. on Nova TV.

References 

Bulgarian television series
2010s Bulgarian television series
2017 Bulgarian television series debuts
Nova (Bulgarian TV channel) original programming